The women's 100m breaststroke events at the 2022 World Para Swimming Championships were held at the Penteada Olympic Swimming Complex in Madeira between 12 and 18 June.

Medalists

Results

SB4
Final
Seven swimmers from five nations took part.

SB5
Final
Six swimmers from six nations took part.

SB6

SB8

SB9

SB11

SB12
Final
Four swimmers from four nations took part.

SB13

References

2022 World Para Swimming Championships
2022 in women's swimming